Felipe Augusto Matos Burin   (born February 10, 1992) is a Brazilian professional baseball infielder who is currently a free agent.  He represented Brazil at the 2013 World Baseball Classic.

He spent 2009-2011 in the Venezuelan Summer League as a member of the Seattle Mariners and was promoted to the Arizona League Mariners in late 2011 and the Pulaski Mariners in 2012. Released after the season he signed with the Dodgers as a minor league free agent.

References

External links

1992 births
2013 World Baseball Classic players
Arizona League Mariners players
Brazilian baseball players
Brazilian expatriate baseball players in the United States
Brazilian expatriate sportspeople in Venezuela
Living people
People from Marília
Pulaski Mariners players
Venezuelan Summer League Mariners players
Brazilian expatriate baseball players in Venezuela
Sportspeople from São Paulo (state)